North Truro station (designated as Moorland station in later years) was a train station located in North Truro, Massachusetts near the intersection of what is now Pond and Twinefield Roads.

North Truro (also known as Pond Village) first saw train service in 1873, when the Old Colony Railroad extended the tracks from Wellfleet, Massachusetts to Provincetown, with a depot probably built the same year. The first train actually arrived on July 23, 1873. It was razed when trackage was dismantled between North Eastham and Provincetown by the New York, New Haven & Hartford Railroad in Fall 1960.

References

External links

 
Old Colony Railroad Stations on Cape Cod
Stations along Old Colony Railroad lines
Demolished buildings and structures in Massachusetts
Former railway stations in Massachusetts